Events in the year 1982 in Mexico.

Incumbents

Federal government
 President: José López Portillo (until November 30), Miguel de la Madrid (starting December 1)
 Interior Secretary (SEGOB): Enrique Olivares Santana (until November 30), Manuel Bartlett Díaz (starting December 1)
 Secretary of Foreign Affairs (SRE): Jorge Castañeda y Álvarez (until November 30), Bernardo Sepúlveda Amor (starting December 1)
 Communications Secretary (SCT): Emilio Mújica Montoya/Rodolfo Félix Valdés
 Secretary of Defense (SEDENA): Félix Galván López/Juan Arévalo Gardoqui
 Secretary of Navy: Ricardo Cházaro Lara/Miguel Ángel Gómez Ortega
 Secretary of Labor and Social Welfare: Pedro Ojeda Paullada/Arsenio Farell Cubillas
 Secretary of Welfare: Pedro Ramírez Vázquez/Marcelo Javelly Girard
 Secretary of Public Education: Fernando Solana Morales/Jesús Reyes Heroles
 Tourism Secretary (SECTUR): Carlos Hank González 
 Secretary of the Environment (SEMARNAT): Fernando Rafful Miguel/Pedro Ojeda Paullada
 Secretary of Health (SALUD): Guillermo Soberón Acevedo

Supreme Court

 President of the Supreme Court: Mario G. Rebolledo Fernández then Jorge Iñárritu y Ramírez de Aguilar

Governors

 Aguascalientes: Rodolfo Landeros Gallegos
 Baja California: Roberto de la Madrid (PRI)
 Baja California Sur: Alberto Andrés Alvarado Arámburo
 Campeche: Eugenio Echeverría Castellot
 Chiapas: Juan Sabines Gutiérrez/Absalón Castellanos Domínguez
 Chihuahua: Oscar Ornelas
 Coahuila: José de las Fuentes Rodríguez
 Colima: Griselda Álvarez
 Durango: Armando del Castillo Franco
 Guanajuato: Enrique Velasco Ibarra
 Guerrero: Alejandro Cervantes Delgado
 Hidalgo: Guillermo Rossell de la Lama
 Jalisco: Flavio Romero de Velasco/Enrique Álvarez del Castillo
 State of Mexico: Alfredo del Mazo González
 Michoacán: Cuauhtémoc Cárdenas
 Morelos
Armando León Bejarano (PRI), until May 18.
Lauro Ortega Martínez (PRI), starting May 18.
 Nayarit: Emilio Manuel González Parra
 Nuevo León: Alfonso Martínez Domínguez
 Oaxaca: Pedro Vázquez Colmenares
 Puebla: Guillermo Jiménez Morales
 Querétaro: Rafael Camacho Guzmán
 Quintana Roo: Pedro Joaquín Coldwell
 San Luis Potosí: Carlos Jonguitud Barrios
 Sinaloa: Antonio Toledo Corro
 Sonora: Samuel Ocaña García
 Tabasco: Leandro Rovirosa Wade/Enrique González Pedrero
 Tamaulipas: Emilio Martínez Manautou	
 Tlaxcala: Tulio Hernández Gómez
 Veracruz: Agustín Acosta Lagunes
 Yucatán: Francisco Luna Kan/Graciliano Alpuche Pinzón
 Zacatecas: José Guadalupe Cervantes Corona
Regent of Mexico City
Carlos Hank González
Ramón Aguirre Velázquez

Events
 Museo Nacional de Arte is founded.
 March – Reino Aventura opens
 March 31 – 14 killed, 100 injured, and 15,000 others suffer the effects of the eruption of the Chichonal volcano, in Francisco León, Chiapas, 100 km from Villahermosa.
 July 4 – 1982 Mexican general election 
 August 12 – Mexico announces it is unable to pay its large foreign debt, triggering a debt crisis that quickly spread throughout Latin America.
 September 1 – During his last government report, president José López Portillo nationalizes banks.

 December 1 – Miguel de la Madrid takes office as President of Mexico.

Awards
Belisario Domínguez Medal of Honor – General Raúl Madero González

Sports 
 Baseball – The Leones del Caracas team conquest their first Caribbean Series title in Hermosillo Sonora.
 Baseball – Indios de Ciudad Juárez win the Mexican League
 Football – 1981–82 Mexican Primera División season

Births
January 9 — Lorenza Morfín, road cyclist
March 7 — Aarón Díaz, model, actor, and singer
 March 13 – Gisela Mota Ocampo, Presidente Municipal of Temixco, Morelos (January 1-January 2, 2016) (assassinated 2016)
 December 19 – Nara Falcón, synchronized swimmer
Date unknown
Raúl Castañeda, boxer (d. September 6, 2017).

Deaths

References 

 
Years of the 20th century in Mexico